Fillaeopsis is a genus of flowering plants in the family Fabaceae. It belongs to the mimosoid clade of the subfamily Caesalpinioideae. It contains a single species, Fillaeopsis discophora.

References

Mimosoids
Monotypic Fabaceae genera